Actinopus confusus is a species of mygalomorph spider in the family Actinopodidae. It can be found in Brazil.

The specific name confusus refers to the Serra das Confusões mountains.

References 

confusus
Spiders described in 2020
Spiders of Brazil